Eddy Willems (born 1962), is a Belgian computer security expert and author of security blogs and books, active in international computer security organizations and as a speaker at information security-related events.

Career 

Eddy Willems has been a security evangelist at German security software specialist G Data Software since the beginning of 2010. He is involved in anti-malware and security research, consultancy, training and communication programs with press, resellers and end-users, as a security evangelist.

He started his career as a systems analyst in 1984, and while working at an insurance company he was challenged in 1989 by a Trojan incident, in fact a very early version of ‘ransomware’ malware, the AIDS Trojan Horse. His system got infected by inserting a (5.25’’) floppy with ‘aids/HIV’-related information (a questionnaire), resulting in a lock down of his system and a request to pay $189. Figuring out how to get around this malware kindled Eddy Willems’ interest in computer viruses and resulted in a well received solution for this Trojan malware. Furthermore, it kick started his anti-virus and anti-malware career. Ever since, Eddy Willems compiles and maintains a reference library on the subject of viruses and malware.

Eddy Willems developed his career as security specialist initially at an insurance company (De Vaderlandsche – today part of P&V), followed by an added value distributor of security products (anti-virus expert at NOXS - a Westcon Group company) and at security software specialist Kaspersky Lab (Benelux, security evangelist).

As his expertise grew, Eddy Willems joined international computer security organizations. In 1991, he became a founding father of EICAR (the European Institute for Computer Anti-Virus Research). In 1995, he joined Joe Wells’ Virus Wildlist, reporting for Belgium, Luxembourg & for EICAR Europe. In May 2005, he became a board member of EICAR, as director of Press and Information. In 2009, he took up the position of director for Security AV Industry Relationships. In 2010, Eddy Willems became a member and PR officer of AMTSO, the Anti-Malware Testing Standards Organization, joining its board in May 2012.

In Belgium, Eddy Willems was a member of the first government initiated e-security team, on the website of the telecom regulator BIPT-IBPT. In 2015, he joined the board of LSEC – Leaders in Security, an association grouping security companies active in Belgium and EU.

Eddy Willems is active on the speakers circuit, with presentations for companies and consumers, as well as at conferences (see Publications section).

. 

He has been asked for comments and opinions by radio and TV-stations, both international (CNN, Al Jazeera) and national (Belgium: VRT, VTM), and national newspapers (De Standaard, De Morgen). Eddy Willems regularly publishes opinions in ict-magazines, as Data News (Belgium) and ZDnet.be.

Education 

IHRB 1982-1984, computer sciences
Vrije Universiteit Brussel 1980-1982, computer sciences

Publications 

  This is a book detailing the dangers and solutions regarding computer security, targeting a readership of consumers and small business. It sketched the history of computer viruses and malware, specific cases, as well as tips and solutions to protect against viruses and malware.
 This is an updated edition translated into German. 
 An English edition of Cybergevaar (as 'Cyberdanger'), translated and updated, was published in June 2019.
Major security white papers and articles include: 
The original article on computer viruses in the Microsoft Encarta Encyclopedia (US Edition, 1997-2009, no longer available online). 

 (Co-authored by David Harley, Eddy Willems and Judith Harley.)
(co-authored by Eddy Willems and Righard Zwienenberg.)
 (Co-authored by David Harley, Eddy Willems, and Lysa Myers.)

Personal 
Eddy Willems is married and has a son.

See also 
EICAR (formerly the European Institute for Computer Antivirus Research)
AMTSO (Anti-Malware Testing Standards Organization)

References

External links 
www.anti-malware.info
www.eddywillems.be

1962 births
Living people
Belgian computer scientists
People associated with computer security
Belgian technology writers